Henry Bendelack Hewetson (1850–1899) was an English surgeon, and also an active naturalist. He wrote books and articles on medical issues and about nature.

Biography 
Henry Bendelack Hewetson was born in Beverley in 1850, as the son of Clementina Juliet and Henry Hewetson (1826-1909). His family removed to Leeds a few years later, so that he was educated at Leeds Grammar School.

In 1868 he entered at the Leeds School of Medicine. He obtained his diploma in 1873, and became a member of the Royal College of Surgeons.  He continued his study in London at Guy's Hospital and at Moorfields Ophtalmic Hospital. After returning to Leeds he became an assistant to Thomas Pridgin Teale.

In 1883 Hewetson was appointed Honorary Surgeon to the Leeds Public Dispensary; a few months later he resigned to become Honorary Ophtalmic and Aural surgeon to the Leeds Infirmary. He published in the fields of ophthalmology and otology.

Henry Bendelack Hewetson died on 15 May 1899 in Hull.

Hewetson as a naturalist 
Henry Bendelack Hewetson was a well known surgeon. But he became equally well known as a naturalist.  When he died, Cordeaux wrote that his loss "will especially be felt by his scientific friends and naturalists, members of the Yorkshire Naturalists' Union and the Leeds Naturalists' Club, of which latter he was four times President." In 1885 he was elected President of the Leeds Naturalists' Club and Scientific Association for the first time. During that year he obtained from the Corporation the grant of a room in the Municipal Buildings for the housing of the collections and library and holding of meetings of that body. He was again elected President in 1886, 1896 and 1897. As President he constantly advocated the foundation of a Scientific Institute by the joint action of the several scientific societies of Leeds.

Hewetson was a keen ornithologist. He recorded several new visitors to the surroundings of Leeds, and, in conjunction with other observers, was active in the field of the study of migration.

Hewetson made two visits to Egypt, two to Morocco, also to Algiers and the Sahara. He also visited the south of France and Italy, the Canary Islands and Cape Verde Islands, and he made short visits to Norway, Sweden and the Netherlands. His last holiday he made to South America. On his visits to the North Coast of Africa he made valuable collections of the birds and insects of that region. His artistic abilities were of great service, for he could depict natural history objects in colours with "wonderful fidelity." His incursions into the realm of photography were limited to the use of a hand camera, with which he was fairly successful.

Some of his lectures on ornithology were published in print.

He presented a valuable collection of Egyptian antiquities to the Museum of the Philosophical Society of Leeds.
 
Hewetson was a Fellow of the Royal Geographical Society, of the Linnean Society and of the Zoological Society. In 1897 he was elected a member of the British Ornithologist Union.

Bibliography 
Among the published works of Henry Bendelack Hewetson are:
 
 
 
 
  (A paper read before the Leeds and West-Riding Medico-Chirurgical Society, 5 December 1884.)
 
 
 
 
  (see also: this copy in archive.org).

References

Sources 
 

  (mind the links to the family tree and transcription of biographical notes)

External links 
 

English naturalists
English surgeons
People educated at Leeds Grammar School
1850 births
1899 deaths
Members of the Yorkshire Naturalists' Union